György Csóti (born November 24, 1940) is a Hungarian politician, member of the National Assembly (MP) from Budapest Regional List between 2011 and 2014. Formerly he was also a member of the National Assembly from 1990 to 1998 (1990-94: MDF National List; 1994-98: MP for Budapest I).

Csóti was a founding member of the Hungarian Democratic Forum (MDF) between 1988 and 2004. He served as Deputy Parliamentary Group Leader from 1996 to 1998. He became Member of Parliament again via the Fidesz party's Budapest Regional List when Zsolt Láng won the by-election in the 2nd District of Budapest and became representative of its constituency. He is a former Deputy Chairman and member of the Committee on Foreign Affairs.

He also served as Hungarian Ambassador to Croatia from 1999 to 2003. Csóti worked for Echo TV as a broadcaster of the foreign policy program between 2005 and 2011. He functioned as the Foreign Policy Advisor for Hungarian President Pál Schmitt from September 1, 2010 to December 23, 2011.

References

1940 births
Living people
Hungarian Democratic Forum politicians
Fidesz politicians
Members of the National Assembly of Hungary (1990–1994)
Members of the National Assembly of Hungary (1994–1998)
Members of the National Assembly of Hungary (2010–2014)
Politicians from Budapest
Ambassadors of Hungary to Croatia